Richard Arnold Burton (1889–1939) was an English footballer who played for Stoke.

Career
Burton was born in Stoke-upon-Trent and played amateur football with North Staffs Normads before joining Stoke in 1913. He played in two first team matches for Stoke during the 1913–14 season before returning to North Staffs Normads.

Career statistics

References

English footballers
Stoke City F.C. players
1889 births
1939 deaths
Association football defenders